Son of Cain is a 2013 Spanish psychological thriller film directed by Jesús Monllaó and starring José Coronado, Julio Manrique, David Solans and Maria Molins. It is based on the novel Dear Cain by Ignacio García-Valiño. It is also Monllaó's directorial debut.

Plot 
The plot concerns the developments set in motion as socially-awkward and gifted chess-playing boy Nico meets child psychologist Julio, who is also a chess aficionado. The latter ends up entangled in the affairs of Nico's family, formed by his Nico's parents Carlos and Coral and his sister, the young Diana.

Cast

Production 
The film was produced by Life&Pictures in co-production with Salto de Eje PC and Fosca Producciones and the associate production of TV3. It features dialogue in both the Spanish and the Catalan languages.

Release 
The film was presented at the Málaga Film Festival's official selection on 22 April 2013. Distributed by Alfa Pictures, the film was theatrically released in Spain on 31 May 2013. The film was excluded from the 28th Goya Awards because the release date was not duly notified in form to the academy.

See also 
 List of Spanish films of 2013

References

External links
 
 

2010s Spanish-language films
2010s Catalan-language films
2013 films
Films based on Spanish novels
Spanish thriller films
2013 psychological thriller films
2013 directorial debut films
2013 multilingual films
Spanish multilingual films
Films about chess
2010s Spanish films
Spanish psychological thriller films